Berlin Symphony Orchestra may refer to:

 Berliner Symphoniker, an orchestra founded in West Berlin in 1967
 Berliner Sinfonie-Orchester, an orchestra founded in East Berlin in 1952, renamed Konzerthausorchester Berlin in 2006